The women's tournament of the 2015 European Curling Championships will be held from November 20 to 28 in Esbjerg, Denmark. The winners of the Group C tournament in Champéry, Switzerland, will move on to the Group B tournament. The top eight women's teams at the 2015 European Curling Championships will represent their respective nations at the 2016 Ford World Women's Curling Championship in Swift Current, Saskatchewan, Canada.

Group A

Teams
Teams are to be announced.

Round-robin standings

Final round-robin standings

Round-robin results
All draw times are listed in Central European Time (UTC+01).

Draw 1
Friday, November 20, 17:30

Draw 2
Saturday, November 21, 14:00

Draw 3
Sunday, November 22, 8:00

Draw 4
Sunday, November 22, 16:00

Draw 5
Monday, November 23, 14:00

Draw 6
Tuesday, November 24, 9:00

Draw 7
Tuesday, November 24, 19:00

Draw 8
Wednesday, November 25, 12:00

Draw 9
Wednesday, November 25, 20:00

World Challenge Games
The World Challenge Games are held between the eighth-ranked team in the Group A round robin and the winner of the Group B tournament to determine which of these two teams will play at the World Championships.

Challenge 1
Friday, November 27, 19:00

Challenge 2
Saturday, November 28, 9:00

Challenge 3
Saturday, November 28, 14:00

Playoffs

Semifinals
Thursday, November 26, 19:00

Bronze medal game
Friday, November 27, 19:00

Gold medal game
Saturday, November 28, 15:00

Player percentages
Round Robin only

Group B

Teams

Round-robin standings

Final round-robin standings

Round-robin results
All draw times are listed in Central European Time (UTC+01).

Draw 1
Thursday, November 19, 20:00

Draw 2
Friday, November 20, 12:00

Italy forfeited the game because they ran out of time.

Draw 3
Saturday, November 21, 8:00

Draw 4
Saturday, November 21, 16:00

Draw 5
Sunday, November 22, 8:00

Draw 6
Monday, November 23, 12:00

Netherlands forfeited the game because they ran out of time.

Draw 7
Monday, November 23, 20:00

Draw 8
Tuesday, November 24, 12:00

Draw 9
Tuesday, November 24, 20:00

Draw 10
Wednesday, November 25, 12:00

Draw 11
Wednesday, November 25, 20:00

Draw 12
Thursday, November 26, 12:00

Tiebreaker
Thursday, November 26, 16:00

Playoffs

Semifinals
Thursday, November 26, 20:00

Bronze medal game
Friday, November 27, 13:30

Gold medal game
Friday, November 27, 13:30

Group C

Teams

Round-robin standings
Final round-robin standings

Round-robin results

Draw 1
Monday, October 12, 16:30

Draw 3
Tuesday, October 13, 12:00

Draw 4
Tuesday, October 13, 16:00

Draw 5
Tuesday, October 13, 20:00

Draw 6
Wednesday, October 14, 8:00

Draw 8
Wednesday, October 14, 16:00

Draw 11
Thursday, October 15, 12:00

Draw 13
Thursday, October 15, 20:00

Draw 14
Friday, October 16, 8:00

Draw 16
Friday, October 16, 16:00

Tiebreaker
Friday, October 16, 20:00

Playoffs

1 vs. 2
Saturday, October 17, 10:00

 advance to Group B competitions.
 advance to Second Place Game.

3 vs. 4
Saturday, October 17, 10:00

 advance to Second Place Game.

Second Place Game
Saturday, October 17, 15:00

 advance to Group B competitions.

References
General

Specific

2015 in women's curling
European Curling Championships
European Curling Championships
Curling competitions in Denmark
November 2015 sports events in Europe
Sport in Esbjerg